Angels of Darkness (Italian: Donne proibite) is a 1954 Italian melodrama film directed by Giuseppe Amato and starring Linda Darnell, Anthony Quinn and Valentina Cortese.

The film's sets were designed by the art director Virgilio Marchi.

Plot 
A brothel is suddenly closed as a prostitute, Tamara, attempts suicide by throwing herself out of the window; she is admitted to the hospital in serious condition. Three of her colleagues, Vally, Franca and Lola, are forced to ask for hospitality from Rosa, who has long since abandoned the profession and now has a nice apartment. Vally wants to change her life and meets Francesco from Abruzzo. They decide to get married, but since the man has to emigrate, they resort to a marriage by proxy. When the young man discovers his troubled past about him, he reproaches it; the woman escapes from despair and goes to meet a tragic death. Tamara, physically damaged, after her hospitalization, has a mystical crisis and will be welcomed in an institute of nuns;  Franca, who already has a daughter, finds a job and welcomes her into her new home. Lola, on the other hand, under the armor of unscrupulousness actually has a sensitive and generous soul. She decides to return to her elderly parents, but discovers that her sister is now close to marriage: to avoid a scandal she decides to give up and resigns herself to returning to the city, to the brothel which has reopened its doors in the meantime; but she realizes that she is seriously ill.

Cast
 Linda Darnell as Lola Baldi
 Anthony Quinn as Francesco Caserto
 Valentina Cortese as Vally  
 Lea Padovani as Franca  
 Giulietta Masina as Rosita  
 Lilla Brignone as Tamara  
 Carlo Dapporto as Vittorio   
 Alberto Farnese as The Sportsman  
 Alberto Talegalli as A relative of Francesco's  
 Checco Durante as Another relative of Francesco's  
 Roberto Risso as Bruno  
 Lola Braccini as Signora Capello  
 Maria Pia Casilio as The Young Girl 
 Rossella Falk as Morena  
 Tino Buazzelli as mayor of Stefano
 Aldo Silvani as senior doctor
 Anita Durante as wife of Amilcare
 Gina Amendola 
  as Gelsomina  
 Anna Maria Bottini as Tamara's friend
 Miranda Campa as woman with red carnation
 Antonio Cifariello as Dr. Carlo
 Edoardo Toniolo as third doctor
 Pina Piovani 
 Maria Zanoli as elderly patient
 Alberto Plebani 
 Antonio Cifariello 
 Margherita Bagni as mother of Bruno
 Memmo Carotenuto as baker
 Cristina Fantoni
 Rina Dei 
 Mino Doro 
 Luigi Pigliacelli
 Patrizia Remiddi as Bambola

References

Bibliography
 Gino Moliterno. The A to Z of Italian Cinema. Scarecrow Press, 2009.

External links
 

1954 films
1954 drama films
1950s English-language films
English-language Italian films
1950s Italian-language films
Italian drama films
Films directed by Giuseppe Amato
Films set in Rome
Films with screenplays by Cesare Zavattini
Films scored by Renzo Rossellini
Italian black-and-white films
Melodrama films
1950s multilingual films
Italian multilingual films
1950s Italian films